Barb Tarbox, MSM (April 10, 1961 – May 18, 2003) was one of the most well-known anti-smoking activists in Canada; a lifelong smoker dying of lung and brain cancer whose very open and frank discussions of her illness, its cause and its consequences, propelled her to the Canadian national stage. 

In high school, between the ages of 14 and 16, she was a model for fashion companies and joined many sports in her school. She wanted to be popular, and being a model was not enough; so she then became a smoker. During the last months of Tarbox's life she went around Canada teaching young adults the consequences of smoking. Perhaps most memorably, she emphasized how she was unable to quit smoking even after she found out that she had cancer. 

Tarbox died at a hospital in Edmonton on May 18, 2003 at the age of 42 from brain cancer and lung cancer.

On December 5, 2003, Barb Tarbox was posthumously awarded the Meritorious Service Medal by Her Excellency, the Right Honourable Adrienne Clarkson, Governor General of Canada, for devotion to the anti-smoking cause. The decoration was accepted in Ottawa by her daughter, Mackenzie.

On December 30, 2010, the Government of Canada unveiled tougher anti-smoking images on their cigarette packaging including two images that feature Barb Tarbox during her last days.

See also
 Heather Crowe (activist)

References

External links
 Photojournal of Barb's last months

1961 births
2003 deaths
Deaths from cancer in Alberta
Deaths from lung cancer
Recipients of the Meritorious Service Decoration
Smoking in Canada
Anti-smoking activists
People from Saint John, New Brunswick
Canadian women activists
Canadian health activists